"Dreamin'" is a song written by Barry De Vorzon and Ted Ellis and performed by Johnny Burnette.  The song appeared on his 1960 album, Dreamin, and was produced by Snuff Garrett.

Background
The personnel on the original recording included Howard Roberts and Vincent Terri on guitar, and Jerry Allison on drums

Chart performance
The song reached #5 on the UK Singles Chart and #11 on the Billboard Hot 100 in 1960.
The song was ranked #86 on Billboard magazine's Top Hot 100 songs of 1960.

Other versions
The Cascades released a version as a single in India as the B-side to "Angel on My Shoulder".
John Schneider released a version as a single in 1982. In the US, it reached No. 21 on the adult contemporary chart, No. 32 on the country chart, and No. 45 on the Billboard Hot 100.

References

1960 songs
1960 singles
1982 singles
Songs written by Barry De Vorzon
Johnny Burnette songs
The Cascades (band) songs
John Schneider (screen actor) songs
Song recordings produced by Snuff Garrett
Liberty Records singles
Rockabilly songs